Tequila Moon is the first studio album from Peak Records recording artist Jessy J.  It includes the Billboard Jazz #1 song "Tequila Moon".  The album was released on March 4, 2008 and produced by Paul Brown.

Track listing
 "Tequila Moon" (Paul Brown, Tommy K, Jessy J) - 4:36
 "Spanish Nights" (Donald Hayes) - 3:45
 "Sin Ti/Without You" (Jessy J, Paul Brown) - 4:35
 "Mas que Nada" (Jorge Ben) - 5:04
 "Fiesta velada" (Jessy J, Paul Brown) - 4:07
 "Poetry Man" (Phoebe Snow) - 3:36
 "Turquoise Street" (Kiki Ebsen) - 4:03
 "PB 'n' J" (Paul Brown, Jessy J) - 3:04
 "Bésame Mucho" (Consuelo Velazquez) - 3:40
 "Running Away" (Jessy J, Paul Brown) - 3:51
 "A Song for You" (Leon Russell) - 5:43

References

2008 debut albums
Jessy J albums
Peak Records albums